Dorcadion aguadoi is a species of beetle in the family Cerambycidae. It was described by Aguado and Tomé in 2000. It is known from Spain.

See also 
Dorcadion

References

aguadoi
Beetles described in 2000